Tom Farquharson is a British tennis player who in 2010 won the Boys' Doubles at Wimbledon partnered with Liam Broady. He primarily competes on the Futures Circuit, and has a career high singles ranking of 429, achieved on 17 March 2014.

Challenger and Futures finals

Singles: 7 (5–2)

Doubles: 1 (1–0)

References

External links

1992 births
Living people
British male tennis players
Wimbledon junior champions
Place of birth missing (living people)
Grand Slam (tennis) champions in boys' doubles